Adam Saif Ismail (born 1957) is a Yemeni actor best known for his comic character Dehbash in the TV series . He was born in Taiz in central Yemen. He has numerous television, radio, theatrical and musical works.

Early life
Saif joined the Taiz Ministry of Culture Office National Theatre Band. He was chosen by director Abdul Aziz al-Harazi to play the comedic character "Hufazi" in the Al-Mahr series, where his TV stardom started.

Main works
 Hekayat Dehbash (Dehbash Tales) series
  (Dehbash blew in the wind) series
 Dheab wa laken (Wolves, but) series
 AlKhafafeesh (The Bats) series
 Abu Alkheer series Alaknea Almutasaqetah (The Dropped Masks) play
 Zawejona Ya Nas'' (Oh People help me get married) play

References

Yemeni actors
1957 births
Living people
Yemeni male television actors
Yemeni male stage actors
People from Taiz Governorate